Len Richardson can refer to:

 Len Richardson (athlete) (1881-1955), a South African Olympic athlete
 Len Richardson (cricketer) (born 1950), an Australian cricketer
 Len Richardson (footballer) (1891-1924), an Australian rules footballer